The women's artistic individual all-around competition at the 2012 Summer Olympics in London was held at the North Greenwich Arena on 2 August.

Format of competition

The top 24 competitors in the qualification round (with a limit of two per country), based on combined scores on the four apparatuses, advanced to the individual all-around final. In the final, gymnasts performed on each apparatus again. Qualification scores were then ignored, with only final-round scores counting.

Qualification results

Only two gymnasts from each country were allowed to advance to the all-around final. Four gymnasts placed in the top 24 in qualifications but did not advance because of the two-per-country rule:
  (4th place)
  (12th place)
  (21st place)
  (22nd place)

Final results

*Aliya Mustafina and Aly Raisman finished with the same total score of 59.566. To break the tie, each gymnast's lowest score was dropped, and their remaining three scores were summed. The resulting totals were 45.933 for Mustafina and 45.366 for Raisman, earning Mustafina the bronze medal.

See also
List of Olympic medalists in gymnastics (women)#All-Around, Individual

References

Gymnastics at the 2012 Summer Olympics
2012
Olympics
2012 in women's gymnastics
Women's events at the 2012 Summer Olympics